Thomas Spicer may refer to:

 Thomas Spicer (Arundel MP), in 1406 MP for Arundel (UK Parliament constituency)
 Thomas Spicer (Orford MP), MP for Orford (UK Parliament constituency)
Thomas le Spicer, MP for Bristol (UK Parliament constituency)
Tommy Spicer (footballer), English footballer